Mores Creek is a stream in the U.S. state of Idaho. It is a tributary to the Boise River.

The stream is named after J. Marion More, a businessperson in the local mining industry. Variant names are "Moore Creek" and "Moores Creek".

See also
Mores Creek Summit

References

Rivers of Idaho
Rivers of Boise County, Idaho